The 1867 Nova Scotia general election was held on 18 September 1867 to elect members of the 24th House of Assembly of the Province of Nova Scotia, Canada. It was the first general election in Nova Scotia after Confederation, and was won by the Anti-Confederation Party.

Results

Results by party

Nominated candidates
1867 Nova Scotia Provincial Election

Legend
bold denotes party leader

Valley

|-
| rowspan="2"|Annapolis
||
|Jared C. Troop1,18727.16%	
|
|W. T. Foster1,01923.31%	
|
|New riding
|-
||
|David C. Landers1,16326.61%	
|
|George Whitman1,00222.92%	
|
|New riding
|-
| rowspan="2"|Digby
||
|William Berrian Vail1,13936.%	
|
|Colin Campbell61219.34%	
|
|New riding
|-
||
|Urbine Doucette1,01031.92%	
|
|J. Melanson40312.74%	
|
|New riding
|-
| rowspan="2"|Hants
||
|William Dawson Lawrence1,52931.64%	
|
|Parker92119.06%	
|
|New riding
|-
||
|Elkanah Young1,47930.60%	
|
|William McDougall90418.70%	
|
|New riding
|-
| rowspan="2"|Kings
||
|David M. Dickie1,39332.87%	
|
|T.W. Harris90421.33%	
|
|New riding
|-
||
|Edward L. Brown1,28030.20%	
|
|R. C. Foster66115.60%	
|
|New riding
|-
|}

South Shore

|-
| rowspan="2"|Lunenburg
||
|Mather Byles DesBrisay1,55331.93%	
|
|Henry S. Jost85317.54%
|
|New riding
|-
||
|James Daniel Eisenhauer1,66434.22%	
|
|W. A. C. Randall79316.31%	
|
|New riding
|-
| rowspan="2"|Queens
||
|William Henry Smith79236.65%	
|
|Allison31014.35%	
|
|New riding
|-
||
|Samuel Freeman78536.33%	
|
|A. J. Campbell27412.68%	
|
|New riding
|-
| rowspan="2"|Shelburne
||
|Robert RobertsonAcclamation
|
|	
|
|New riding
|-
||
|Thomas JohnsonAcclamation
|
|
|
|New riding
|-
| rowspan="3"|Yarmouth
||
|John K. Ryerson1,13832.53%	
|
|John Van Norden Hatfield62617.90%	
|rowspan=2|
|rowspan=2|New riding
|-
|
|W. G. Goucher72620.75%
|
|Isaac Smith Hatfield611.74%
|-
||
|William H. Townsend85324.39%	
|
|J. Smith Hatfield942.69%
|
|New riding
|}

Fundy-Northeast

|-
| rowspan="2"|Colchester
||
|Thomas Fletcher Morrison1,64128.59%	
|
|Samuel Rettie1,31122.84%	
|
|New riding
|-
||
|Robert Chambers1,62528.32%	
|
|N. McKim1,16220.25%	
|
|New riding
|-
| rowspan="2"|Cumberland
||
|Amos Purdy1,30925.07%
|
|Edward Vickery1,28424.59%
|
|New riding
|-	
|
|W. Fullerton1,29124.73%	
||
|Henry Gesner Pineo Jr.1,33725.61%	
|
|New riding
|}

Halifax

|-
| rowspan="3"|Halifax
||
|Jeremiah Northup2,38617.64%	
|
|Philip Carteret Hill2,15215.91%	
|
|New riding
|-
||
|James Cochran2,36617.49%	
|
|S. Tobin2,12915.74%
|
|New riding
|-
||
|Henry Balcom2,36417.48%
|
|G. McLeod2,12915.74%
|
|New riding
|}

Central Nova

|-
| rowspan="2"|Antigonish
||
|Daniel MacDonald1,42445.95%	
|
|R. N. Henry41013.23%	
|
|New riding
|-
||
|Joseph MacDonald1,07234.59%	
|
|J. Macdonald1936.23%	
|
|New riding
|-
| rowspan="2"|Guysborough
||
|John Joseph Marshall73032.10%	
|
|J. A. Tory44319.48%	
|
|New riding
|-
||
|John Angus Kirk67429.64%	
|
|Alexander N. McDonald42718.78%	
|
|New riding
|-
| rowspan="3"|Pictou
||
|George Murray2,01918.45%	
|
|Simon Hugh Holmes1,68415.38%	
|
|New riding
|-
||
|Robert S. Copeland1,97718.06%	
|
|Donald Fraser1,64915.06%
|
|New riding
|-
||
|Martin Isaac Wilkins1,96817.98%
|
|Alexander MacKay1,64915.06%
|
|New riding
|}

Cape Breton

|-
| rowspan="3"|Cape Breton
||
|Alonzo J. White96329.39%	
|rowspan=2|
|rowspan=2|Newton LeGayet Mackay61618.80%	
|rowspan=2|
|rowspan=2|New riding
|-
|
|S. L. Purvis47114.37%
|-
||
|John Fergusson70221.42%	
|
|P. Cadegan52516.02%	
|
|New riding
|-
| rowspan="3"|Inverness
||
|Alexander Campbell1,05830.51%
|
|
|
|New riding
|-
|
|H. McInnis93226.87%	
|rowspan=2 |
|rowspan=2|Hiram Blanchard98628.43%
|rowspan=2|
|rowspan=2|New riding
|-	
|
|A. Gillis49214.19%
|-
| rowspan="2"|Richmond
||
|Edmund Power Flynn58339.85%	
|
|J. H. Hearn36224.74%	
|
|New riding
|-
||
|Josiah Hooper51835.41%	
|
|
|
|New riding
|-
| rowspan="3"|Victoria
||
|John Ross62137.21%	
|
|Charles James Campbell25615.34%	
|
|New riding
|-
|rowspan=2 |
|rowspan=2|William Kidston57134.21%	
|
|McLean1629.71%	
|rowspan=2|
|rowspan=2|New riding
|-
|
|Haliburton593.53%
|}

References

1867
1867 elections in Canada
1867 in Nova Scotia
September 1867 events